This is a list of all megatall skyscrapers at least 600m tall. As of 2022, only four completed buildings are 'megatall' and none are currently under construction, though dozens have been proposed.

Megatall skyscrapers

Proposed megatall skyscrapers

See also

List of supertall skyscrapers
List of tallest buildings
List of visionary tall buildings and structures

References

Further reading
 

 
Megatall skyscrapers
Megatall skyscrapers